Usolye is a rural locality (a selo) in Bryzgalovskoye Rural Settlement, Kameshkovsky District, Vladimir Oblast, Russia. The population was 51 as of 2010.

Geography 
Usolye is located on the Uvod River, 21 km northeast of Kameshkovo (the district's administrative centre) by road. Serebrovo is the nearest rural locality.

References 

Rural localities in Kameshkovsky District